The Baddest: Only For Lovers In The Mood is a compilation by Japanese singer Toshinobu Kubota. The album was released on July 24, 2002 on Sony Music Entertainment. Unlike its predecessors, the album only features love songs, excluding the Kubota's hit singles from the album. The album charted at number 22 on the Oricon Weekly Albums chart and remained on the charts for two weeks.

Track listing
No Lights... Candle Light (United Groove Version)
Too Lite 2 Do
Angel
6 to 8
Silk No Ai Ga Hosikkute
Till She Comes
In The Mood (Original performance by The Whispers)
Love Reborn (KC's What'cha Gonna Do? Remix)
Shooting Star
Jam With Me
Let's Make One Shadow
Get It Together
Just the Two of Us (Smooth R&B Remix) (Duet with Caron Wheeler)

References

2002 compilation albums
Toshinobu Kubota albums